Somovo is a rural locality (a selo) and the administrative center of Somovskoye Rural Settlement, Ramonsky District, Voronezh Oblast, Russia. The population was 547 as of 2010. There are 6 streets.

Geography 
Somovo is located 47 km west of Ramon (the district's administrative centre) by road. Gremyachye is the nearest rural locality.

References 

Rural localities in Ramonsky District